Rubber hose animation was the first animation style that became standardized in the American animation field. The defining feature is the curving motion most things possess, resembling that of a rubber hose. While the style fell out of fashion during the 1930s, there has been a minor revitalization of it in recent years with works such as the video games Cuphead and Bendy and the Ink Machine, and the film Steven Universe: The Movie.

History

Beginnings and rise 
In the early days of hand drawn animation in the 1920s, the studios' main areas were not in Hollywood, but New York City. Animation was a new phenomenon and there were no experienced animators; yet there were skilled artists working on newspapers, creating comic strips in a time when even the comic strips themselves were relatively new. Many of them became fascinated with the introduction of moving drawings, and saw them as new possibilities and challenges to use their skills on something they found more exciting than the newspaper strips.

For this reason, many of the first cartoons had many similarities with moving comic strips. The artists experimented with what worked and what did not, and what they could and could not do. In the strips, they had no need to think of their work in three dimensions or how they moved, but at the same time this extra aspect gave them the opportunity to introduce gags and elements not possible in comic stills. Moreover, because the drawings had to be mass-produced to create the illusion of movement, they had to come up with a compromise where characters were less detailed and time-consuming, but at the same time alive and complex enough.  As animators gained experience through trial, error and collaborations, cartoons became more professional and dominated by specific rules of how to make them.

The studios had to be sensitive to any new business trend to survive the competition. A consequence of this was that the style and design of the most successful and popular cartoons had a great impact on the rest of the animation business. One of the earliest examples was Felix the Cat, who quickly spawned imitators at different studios. Combined with the natural evolution of animation, this resulted in a dominating design that would be known as the rubber hose style, despite individual differences between the studios. Bill Nolan is credited with the introduction of this animation style.

Decline and fall 
Rubber hose animation gradually faded away as cartoons were made more sophisticated, especially by Walt Disney. Disney wanted to make his cartoons more realistic and have them follow much of the same rules as live action, a direction that would later be named full animation. Disney saw animation as a potential surrogate for live action, where he could do what was impossible in live action once it achieved his demands of realism. This direction did not allow the fluid bodies seen in the rubber hose style and, due to Disney's success, this trend was spread to the remaining producers of cartoons through demands from their Hollywood distributors.

Rubber-hose trademarks appeared in some later cartoons, including those of Tex Avery for MGM, The Warner Siblings for WB Animation, or Ren and Stimpy, but the original style and its influence became a part of animation history by the start of the 1930s, and went out of favor by the mid-1930s. Fleischer Studios held to it the longest, finally conforming to the more contemporary West Coast animation style by 1940. The style's influence, however, still continues into the present, with shows like Adventure Time incorporating some of rubber hose animation's elements, and Cuphead the video game paying full homage.

Influence in modern media
While there are not many uses of rubber hose animation today, there are some media that pay homage to the animation style.

Theatrical animated shorts

In 2013, Walt Disney Animation Studios produced a 3D animated slapstick comedy short film using the style. Get a Horse! combines black-and-white hand-drawn animation and color CGI animation; the short features the characters of the late 1920s Mickey Mouse cartoons and features archival recordings of Walt Disney in a posthumous role as Mickey Mouse. It is the first original Mickey Mouse theatrical animated short since Runaway Brain (1995) and the first appearance of Oswald the Lucky Rabbit in a Disney animated production in 85 years.

Video games
Some video games use rubber hose animation, including Epic Mickey, Bendy and the Ink Machine, Cuphead, and early Sonic the Hedgehog games, shows and comics. Skullgirls includes the playable character "Peacock", whose visual design and attacks draw from 1920s animation tropes. Bendy and the Ink Machine's characters are based on 1920s rubber hose animation, having the appearance of old black and white cartoons. Smite has two gods with skins that take inspiration from the rubber hose animation with Baron Samedi as Funny Bones and Cthulhu as Toon Mania. The animation for each of Cuphead'''s numerous characters and creatures relies heavily on techniques pioneered by the animation style; its creators wanted players to feel as though they were watching a 1930s cartoon. Sonic the Hedgehog also had rubber hose limbs, especially in the games in the 90s. An example of his rubber hose limbs is evident in his trademark pose with one hand on his hip, a waving finger and crossed legs, seen on the box art of his original game. He also uses some exaggerated running poses. The 2023 video gamePizza Tower shows the characters animated in a similar, cartoonish art style.

 Card games 
The Japanese trading-card game Yu-Gi-Oh! and the franchise it is based around features a line of cards called 'Toons', based on 1920s American animation styles (to contrast with the Japanese animation style of most cards).

Television
The Futurama episode "Reincarnation", in its segment "Colorama", uses rubber hose animation. In this portion of the episode, the characters are rather bouncy and have an air of playfulness about them.
Another prominent use of rubber hose animation is Disney Television's Mickey Mouse. The series has the slapstick feel of the original Mickey Mouse shorts, while providing a modern update with the extensive use of Toon Boom and Flash animation, and "presents Mickey in a broad range of humorous situations that showcase his pluck and rascality, along with his long-beloved charm and good-heartedness.
The claymation TV series, Pingu has techniques incorporated in its animation, such as having characters have their upper body stretch to reach up or roll up in a ball.
The animated series Tom And Jerry uses rubberhose techniques in its characters.
The mascot of Planters, Mr. Peanut, who is an anthropomorphic peanut who wears 1930s style Gentleman clothing, in his advertisements he does rubberhose techniques, and his son Peanut Jr. who does the same things as him
The mascot of both Hasbro and Monopoly, Mr. Monopoly, has 1930s Gentleman clothing. In his advertisements, he does rubberhose gags and techniques to the players.The Peanuts Movie and the Peanuts specials and shows use rubberhose elements as well as the Peanuts comics they are based on.
The Adult Swim original shows Superjail! and King Star King drew some influence from rubber hose cartoons from the likes of Fleischer Studios and Walt Disney.
 Barks the Dog and Fred the Cat are on YouTube and TikTok but only one espisode from Barks is on YouTube while many are on TikTok.
In Ice Age, Scrat uses rubberhose elements, by extending his body and bouncing around while trying to get his acorn.
In the episode "Truth or Square" from the television series SpongeBob SquarePants, Patchy the Pirate presents a film of how the cartoon would have been like if it was made in the 1930s. In the film, the animation is done in rubber hose animation and the song used is called Rubber Hose Rag.
In the episode "It's A Wonderful Half-Life" from CatDog, the dream sequence for the entire episode is done in the style of the 1920s–1930s cartoons, and the characters all have pie eyes.
In the episode "Name That Toon" from Pucca, the entire episode is centered around this, complete with a Betty Boop lookalike shown.
In Adventures of Sonic The Hedgehog, many characters use Rubber hose elements including Sonic and Miles Tails Prower.
Mondo Media's Happy Tree Friends is done in rubber hose style using Flash animation and most of the characters have 'pie eyes', which are in the shape of Pac-Man's body and that resemble eyes from rubber hose characters from the golden period of this animation style, the 1920s and 1930s.
In Steven Universe: The Movie, the main antagonist Spinel is animated in this style but other characters remain animated in the more contemporary style typical of the series so far. Spinel uses this stretchy and unarticulated movement to her advantage, stretching and morphing her limbs into objects she uses in battle to get the upper hand. Her main song and most of her music themes are in Electroswing, a modern twist on music from the time period where Spinel's character inspiration came from.
In Bojack Horseman season 6, the conglomerate Whitewhale plays a video to new corporate employees which includes several animation techniques different from the dominant style of the show, including a segment done in classic rubber hose animation.
Lauren MacMullan cited rubber hose animation as an influence for her style, including for her character designs in Mission Hill.The Cuphead Show!, a Netflix original series, is influenced by rubber-hose cartoons, much like the video game it is based on.
John R. Dilworth, creator of Courage the Cowardly Dog, loved rubber hose animation, despite drawing more influence from Bob Clampett, Tex Avery, and Salvador Dalí, as he paid some homage to it in some of his works, such as in a 1998 promo he did for Cartoon Network, in which featured Whizzo, the very first cartoon, voiced by Jim Cummings.The Twisted Tales of Felix the Cat also had rubber hose influence.
Rob Renzetti cited rubber hose cartoons as an influence for the style of My Life as a Teenage Robot.
The Yu-Gi-Oh! anime series, like the card game itself, features 'Toon' cards based on 1920s American animation.
In one episode of The Grim Adventures of Billy & Mandy, Billy is briefly depicted in this art style while he inflates his nose in a rubber hose fashion, and it explodes shortly after.
DJ Catnip and his cousin, DJ Comet, from Gabby's Dollhouse can stretch their limbs in a similar fashion to rubber hose animation.
Mr. Tickle from The Mr. Men Show can stretch his arms in this fashion.
One episode of Teen Titans Go! features the Titans depicted in this art style.

Music videos
The video for Dua Lipa's single "Hallucinate" depicts Lipa and a series of fantastical characters in rubber hose animation.
Ghostmane released a music video for his song "AI" that portrays the artist in a combination of rubber hose animation and stop motion animation.
The video for Jay Z's "The Story of O.J." uses a rubber hose animation style.

Comic books
In the manga One Piece'', the protagonist Monkey D. Luffy eats a fruit that gives him the ability to stretch like rubber, which he enhances using techniques similar to those in rubber hose cartoons, such as blowing air into his arm to increase its size and punching power. When awakening all its power as "Gear 5", Luffy gains the ability to use fighting techniques based on other rubber hose animation style, such as tearing a piece of ground like a mat to deflect attacks, while he himself (and those that are in his vicinity) also behave similarly to rubber hose cartoons, such as having his head deform around a spiked club and take its shape, or cause people around him to have exaggerated eye pops. It was confirmed at a later interview that Gear 5 is heavily inspired by Tom and Jerry cartoons.

References

Animation techniques
History of animation